Puerto Rico Highway 170 (PR-170) is a road located in Cayey, Puerto Rico. This highway begins at its intersection with PR-14 and PR-731 in downtown Cayey and ends at its junction with PR-1 and PR-206 in Matón Arriba.

Major intersections

See also

 List of highways numbered 170

References

External links
 

170
Cayey, Puerto Rico